"Buy one, get one free" or "two for the price of one" is a common form of sales promotion. Economist Alex Tabarrok has argued that the success of this promotion lies in the fact that consumers value the first unit significantly more than the second one. So compared to a seemingly equivalent "Half price off" promotion, they may only buy one item at half price, because the value they attach to the second unit is lower than even the discounted price.

This technique is commonly known in the marketing industry by the acronym BOGOF, or simply BOGO.

Criticism 
Two-for-one promotions in the food industry have been criticized as contributing to food waste. Because many foods under such offers have short shelf lives, customers are more likely to pass the products' use by date.

References 

Sales promotion